Mirosława Danuta Wałęsa (née Gołoś; born 25 February 1949), is the wife of the former President of Poland  Lech Wałęsa. In 1983 she accepted the Nobel Peace Prize in Oslo, Norway on behalf of her husband, who feared, at a time of great political upheaval in the country, that the Polish government might not allow him to return if he travelled to Oslo himself. Lech and Danuta have been married since 8 November 1969 and have eight children.

Danuta grew up the second of nine children in Krypy village near Węgrów (Krypy, Gmina Liw).  She was working in a flower shop near the Lenin Shipyard in Gdańsk when she met Lech Wałęsa, then an electrician. After they married, she began using her middle name more than her first name, per Lech's request. She was more resolutely anti-Communist than her husband. During her husband's frequent interrogations by the SB in the 1980s, she was known to openly taunt officers who came to pick him up.

Released in 2011, Danuta Wałęsa's autobiography Marzenia i tajemnice ("Dreams and Secrets", coauthored by Piotr Adamowicz) has sold over 400,000 copies.

References

Fundacja "Sprawni inaczej" (Foundation Differently Able) 
Dziennik 

Living people
People from Węgrów County
First Ladies of Poland
1949 births
Polish Roman Catholics
Polish anti-communists